The Centre de services scolaire des Laurentides is a francophone school service centre in the Canadian province of Quebec, headquartered in Sainte-Agathe-des-Monts. It comprises several primary schools and high schools across municipalities in the Laurentides region. The commission is overseen by a board of elected school trustees.

Schools
Secondary schools:
 École Polyvalente des Monts (Sainte-Agathe-des-Monts)
 Pavillon Sacré-Cœur (Saint-Donat)
 École Vert-Pré (Huberdeau)
 École secondaire Curé-Mercure (Mont-Tremblant)
 École secondaire Augustin-Norbert-Morin (Sainte-Adèle)

Primary schools:
 Chante-au-Vent (Sainte-Adèle)
 Fleur-des-Neiges (Sainte-Agathe-des-Monts)
 L'Arc-en-ciel (Huberdeau)
 L'Odyssée (Mont-Tremblant)
 La Relève (La Minerve)
 Le Carrefour (Saint-Rémi-d'Amherst)
 Le Tremplin (Labelle)
 Lionel-Groulx / Monseigneur-Bazinet (Has two campuses in Sainte-Agathe-des-Monts: Pavillon Lionel-Groulx and Pavillon Monseigneur-Bazinet)
 Monseigneur-Lionel-Sheffer (Sainte-Marguerite-du-Lac-Masson)
 Monseigneur-Ovide-Charlebois (Sainte-Marguerite-du-Lac-Masson)
 Notre-Dame-de-la-Sagesse (Sainte-Agathe-des-Monts)
 Campus primaire Mont-Tremblant (has four campuses in Mont-Tremblant: Pavillon Fleur-Soleil, Pavillon La Ribambelle, Pavillon Tournesol, and Pavillon Trois-Saisons)
 Sacré-Cœur (Has two campuses in Saint-Donat: Pavillon Notre-Dame-de-Lourdes and Pavillon Sainte-Bernadette)
 Saint-Jean-Baptiste / Sainte-Marie (has two campuses in Val-David: Pavillon Saint-Jean-Baptiste and Pavillon Sainte-Marie)
 Saint-Joseph (Sainte-Adèle)
 École primaire de Saint-Sauveur (has two campuses in Saint-Sauveur: Pavillon De la Vallée and Pavillon Marie-Rose)

References

External links
 Commission scolaire des Laurentides 

School districts in Quebec
Education in Laurentides